Goryō Station is the name of two train stations in Japan:

 Goryō Station (Hiroshima)
 Goryō Station (Kagoshima)